Macrochloris dissecta is a species of algae in the family Actinochloridaceae.

References

Chlamydomonadales